Mittelherwigsdorf is a municipality in the district Görlitz, in Saxony, Germany.

See also
Steinbruch Eckartsberg

References 

Populated places in Görlitz (district)